The Hidden Gem, officially St Mary's Catholic Church, is a church on Mulberry Street, Manchester, England. The parish dates back to 1794, with devotion to St Mary, Our Lady of the Assumption, however the church was rebuilt in 1848.

History
The first permanent Catholic Mass Centre to be opened in Manchester following the Reformation was dedicated to St Chad, the Rook Street chapel which opened in 1774 serviced about 600 people coming from as far away as Bolton, Glossop and Macclesfield.  In the following years, with the advent of the Industrial Revolution, Catholic families from Ireland were attracted to the cotton industry in Manchester. This chapel remained in use until it was destroyed by fire in 1846. St Chad's then moved to its own purpose built church in Cheetham Hill.

In the mid 1790s, the rector of St Chad's, Father Rowland Broomhead decided to set-up a second chapel in Manchester, he purchased a plot of land near Deansgate and quickly set about the task of building a new church, which opened 30 November 1794, dedicated to St Mary. Contrary to popular local myth, St Mary's was never built in secret or to be hidden, in fact the opening was announced in the local newspapers and Mulberry Street in the 1790s was a busy residential and commercial thoroughfare opening out onto Deansgate.

Collapse of the roof
In 1833, the rector of the Hidden Gem, Father Henry Gillow, decided the building was looking tired. He enlisted the help of some of the congregation to have the church re-roofed and re-decorated. It was to be tremendous folly not to have had the work overseen by a master builder.

At lunchtime on 8 August 1835, a strange breaking sound could be heard. On looking up people were alarmed to see a crack forming in the dome above the altar. The church was locked up and at 11 pm the whole dome and part of the roof collapsed, damaging much of the interior of the church. Services were moved to Lloyd Street, and the search started for a new site for the church.

Father Gillow died in the Manchester typhus epidemic of 1837. Any plans for a new site were put on hold, and the decision was taken to rebuild St Mary's on the existing site. Two architects were consulted, Richard Lane, the architect of Salford Town Hall and the Friends Meeting House, and Augustus Pugin. Richard Lane's design was chosen at a cost of £265 17s 0d.  (Pugin had been paid £138 3s 6d).  The architect chosen to oversee the work was Matthew Ellison Hadfield, who later went on to build Salford Cathedral and the new St Chad's Church in Cheetham Hill. St Mary's Church was entirely demolished and the new St Mary's was formally opened in October 1848. The church's design is a blend of Norman, Gothic and Byzantine detail; Pugin himself said that the building "shows to what depth of error even good men fall, when they go whoring after strange styles."

Exterior and interior
Externally, the Hidden Gem is built of plain red brick, with an ornate bell tower, stone-dressed church windows, and an entrance marked out with a fine stone doorway, which is finely carved and depicts two Angelic Hosts bearing a medallion of Agnus Dei. A hand above forms the sign of the Ascension of Christ. The inscription is "Ascendamus in montem Domini. Et adoremus in loco Sancto eius" a construction of two bible verses: "Come, let us go up to the mountain of the Lord",(Isaiah 2:3) and "Praise Him in His Holy places". (Psalms 150:1)

Internally, there is majestic Victorian carving. The High Altar is made of marble, finely carved and life size images of Our Lady, St Stephen, St Patrick, St Peter, St John, St Hilda, St Augustine and St Joseph. Central to this above the tabernacle is Christ bearing the Sacred Heart. The Stations of the Cross were painted in 1994 by artist Norman Adams and are in a striking expressionist style.

See also

Listed buildings in Manchester-M2
List of churches in Greater Manchester
Diocese of Salford churches

References

Bibliography
Clinch, Dennis (1992) Manchester’s Hidden Gem  Privately Published 
Salford Diocesan Almanac 1898

External links

 St Mary's Church site

Churches in Manchester
Tourist attractions in Manchester
Grade II listed churches in Manchester
Roman Catholic churches in Greater Manchester
Grade II listed Roman Catholic churches in England
Italianate architecture in England
Roman Catholic Diocese of Salford